Arkana is an unincorporated community in Baxter County, Arkansas, United States. The community is located along Arkansas Highway 201.

References

Unincorporated communities in Baxter County, Arkansas
Unincorporated communities in Arkansas